The III Fighter Command is an inactive United States Air Force unit.  Its last assignment was at MacDill Field, Florida.   It was inactivated on 8 April 1946.

History

Background
GHQ Air Force (GHQ,AF) had been established with two major combat functions, to maintain a striking force against long range targets, and the air defense of the United States.  In the spring of 1941, the War Department established four strategic defense areas and GHQ, AF reorganized its Southeast Air District as 3rd Air Force with responsibility for air defense planning and organization in the southeastern.  3rd Air Force activated 3rd Interceptor Command at Drew Field, Florida in 1941, under the command of Major General Walter H. Frank.  The command's initial tactical component was the 8th Pursuit Wing.

Air defense
The attack on Pearl Harbor put all units on heightened alert.  The command was charged with control of "active agents" for air defense in its area of responsibility, which included interceptor aircraft, antiaircraft artillery and barrage balloons.  Civilian organizations provided air raid warnings and enforced blackouts and came under the authority of the Office of Civilian Defense and the command worked "feverishly" to create a ground observer corps as elements of its Aircraft Warning Service.  However,  it soon became apparent that having two commands responsible for air defense in the Eastern Theater of Operations was impractical.  1st Interceptor Command was given the mission of defending the East and Gulf coasts, while 3rd concentrated on the training mission starting early in 1942.  Although the command retained responsibility for air defense on the Gulf coast west of the Apalachicola River, no "vital air defense zone" was established for this area, as it was for the Pacific and East coasts.

Unit and crew training
The command trained fighter organizations and personnel.  By the end of 1942, the command's training consisted almost entirely of Replacement Training Units (RTU).

The command was inactivated in April 1946.  It was transferred in inactive status to the newly-independent United States Air Force in September 1947, and was disbanded in October 1948.

Lineage
 Constituted as the 3rd Interceptor Command on 26 May 1941
 Activated 17 June 1941
 Redesignated 3rd Fighter Command on 15 May 1942
 Redesignated III Fighter Command c. 18 September 1942
 Inactivated on 8 April 1946
 Disbanded on 8 October 1948

Assignments
 3rd Air Force (later Third Air Force), 17 June 1941
 Fifteenth Air Force 21 March 1946 – 8 April 1946

Components
Wings
 8th Pursuit Wing (later 8th Fighter Wing), assigned c. 1 July – 1 November 1941; attached 28 July – c. 28 October 1942
 19th Bombardment Wing, attached 24 July 1942 – 28 September 1942
 22d Bombardment Training Wing, 6 August – 15 August 1943

Groups

 2nd Air Commando Group: 22 April – c. 12 November 1944
 3rd Air Commando Group: 1 May – c. 1 December 1944
 31st Pursuit Group (later 31st Fighter Group): 18 April – 9 June 1942
 48th Bombardment Group (later 48th Fighter-Bomber Group): 6 August 1943 – 31 March 1944 (attached to I Tactical Air Division 10 September 1943 – 14 January 1944)
 49th Pursuit Group: attached 9 August 1941, assigned 2 October 1941 – February 1942
 50th Pursuit Group (later 50th Fighter Group): 2 October 1941 – 28 May 1942
 52nd Fighter Group: 26 November 1942 – 1 May 1944
 54th Pursuit Group (later 54th Fighter Group), 18 April 1942 – 1 May 1944
 56th Pursuit Group: attached 17 June 1941, assigned 2 October 1941 – 15 January 1942
 58th Pursuit Group (later 58th Fighter Group): 2 October 1941 – 17 October 1942
 59th Fighter Group: by September 1943 – 1 May 1944
 80th Pursuit Group (later 80th Fighter Group): 9 February – 20 June 1942
 85th Bombardment Group (later 85th Fighter-Bomber Group), 6 August 1943 – 1 May 1944
 405th Fighter-Bomber Group, 15 August 1943 – 6 March 1944
 408th Fighter-Bomber Group, 15 August – 10 November 1943, 12 February – 24 March 1944

Squadrons
 32d Reconnaissance Squadron (Fighter): 15 August – 1 September 1943
 34th Reconnaissance Squadron (Fighter): 15 August – 1 September 1943
 99th Fighter Squadron: attached 19 August 1942 – 24 April 1943
 403d Fighter Squadron: 15 March – 7 August 1943
 439th Fighter Squadron: 22 February 1943 – 1 March 1944

Other
 555th Signal Aircraft Warning Battalion: 4 July – 8 October 1942

Stations
 Drew Field, Florida, 17 June 1941
 MacDill Field, Florida, c. 1 December 1945 – 8 April 1946

References

Notes
Explanatory notes

Citations

Bibliography

 
 
 
 

03
003